Shu'ayb ibn Khazim was a son of the famed Khurasani Arab general Khazim ibn Khuzayma al-Tamimi, and served as governor of Damascus under Caliph Harun al-Rashid (r. 786–809).

Sources
 

8th-century births
9th-century deaths
Abbasid governors of Damascus
8th-century Arabs
9th-century Arabs